The 2015 CONCACAF Men's Olympic Qualifying Championship qualification was a men's under-23 football competition which decided the participating teams of the 2015 CONCACAF Men's Olympic Qualifying Championship. Players born on or after 1 January 1993 were eligible to compete in the tournament.

A total of eight teams qualified to play in the final tournament, where the berths were allocated to the three regional zones as follows:
Three teams from the North American Zone (NAFU), i.e., Canada, Mexico and the hosts United States, who all qualified automatically
Three teams from the Central American Zone (UNCAF)
Two teams from the Caribbean Zone (CFU)

The top two teams of the final tournament qualified for the 2016 Summer Olympics men's football tournament in Brazil, while the third-placed team advanced to the CONCACAF–CONMEBOL play-off against the 2015 South American Youth Football Championship runner-up for the final berth in the Olympics.

Teams
A total of 27 CONCACAF member national teams entered the tournament. Among them, three teams qualified automatically for the final tournament, and 24 teams entered the regional qualifying competitions.

Notes
1 Non-IOC member, ineligible for Olympics.

Central American Zone

In the Central American Zone, all seven UNCAF member national teams entered the qualifying competition. They were divided into two groups, one with four teams and the other with three teams. The draw to allocate teams to each group was made on 28 February 2015 at the UNCAF Executive Committee meeting in Managua, Nicaragua. The groups were played between 11–15 August 2015 in Panama (group A) and Guatemala (group B) respectively. The two group winners and the winner of the repechage playoff between the two group runners-up (two-legged tie), played between 19–23 August 2015, qualified for the final tournament as the UNCAF representatives.

Times UTC−5 for group A; UTC−6 for group B and repechage playoff.

Group A

Group B

Repechage playoff

Costa Rica won 1–0 on aggregate and qualified for 2015 CONCACAF Men's Olympic Qualifying Championship.

Goalscorers
2 goals

 Júnior Andrade
 Joshua Nieto
 Óscar Salas
 Carlos Chavarría
 Édgar Joel Bárcenas

1 goal

 Allan Cruz
 Ariel Lassiter
 Ronald Matarrita
 Miguel Lemus
 Rommel Mejía
 José Ángel Peña
 José Longo
 Kevin Mérida
 Bryan Acosta
 Alberth Elis
 Marlon Ramírez
 Axel Silva
 Chin Hormechea
 José Muñoz
 Francisco Narbón
 Justin Simons

Caribbean Zone

In the Caribbean Zone, 17 CFU member national teams entered the qualifying competition. Among them, two teams (Dominica and Saint Vincent and the Grenadines) played in the preliminary round (two-legged tie) between 22–24 May 2015. The winner advanced to the first round to join the other 15 teams.

In the first round, the 16 teams were divided into four groups of four teams. The groups were played between 24–28 and 25–29 June 2015 and hosted by one of the teams in each group. The four group winners advanced to the final round.

In the final round, played between 14–16 August 2015 and hosted by one of the teams in the final round, the four teams played a single-elimination tournament. The top two teams qualified for the final tournament as the CFU representatives.

Times UTC−4.

Preliminary round
Matches played in Saint Vincent and the Grenadines.

Saint Vincent and the Grenadines won 5–0 on aggregate and advanced to Group 4.

First round

Group 1
Matches played in Haiti.

Group 2
Matches played in Antigua and Barbuda (changed from original hosts Aruba).

Group 3
Matches played in Dominican Republic (changed from original host Saint Lucia).

Group 4
Matches played in Puerto Rico.

Final round
Matches played in Haiti.

Semi-finals
Winners qualified for 2015 CONCACAF Men's Olympic Qualifying Championship.

Third place playoff

Final

Goalscorers
7 goals
 Maikel Reyes

5 goals

 Michael Seaton
 Oalex Anderson

4 goals
 Tevin Slater

3 goals

 Frank Manuel López
 Woodensky Cherenfant
 Romario Williams
 Ricardo John

2 goals

 Elijah McDonald
 Mahlon Romeo
 Javorn Stevens
 Elvis Thomas
 Arichel Hernández
 Héctor Morales
 Daniel Luis Sáez
 Trayon Bobb
 Jonel Désiré
 Benchy Estama
 Mancini Telfort
 Harry Panayiotou
 Kimaree Rogers
 Chavel Cunningham
 Akeem Roach
 Rundell Winchester

1 goal

 Tevaughn Harriette
 Calaum Jahraldo-Martin
 Eugene Kirwan
 Jonathan Ruiz
 Shaquille Barzey
 Kemar Headley
 Dairon Pérez
 David Urgelles
 Geremy Lombardi
 Pedro Emil Martínez
 Miguel de Jesús Ramírez
 Domini Garnett
 Pernell Schultz
 Daniel Wilson
 Alex Junior Christian
 Jean-François James
 Junior Flemmings
 Andre Lewis
 Jamar Loza
 Sean McFarlane
 Paul Wilson
 Cooper Nugent
 Reid Strain
 Keithroy Freeman
 Dahjal Kelly
 Vinceroy Nelson
 Glenroy Samuel
 Nile Walwyn
 David Henry
 Brad Miguel
 Azinho Solomon
 Aikim Andrews

Own goal

 Yosel Piedra (playing against Jamaica)
 Malcolm Joseph (playing against Saint Vincent and the Grenadines)

Qualified teams
The following eight teams qualified for the final tournament.

1 Bold indicates champion for that year. Italic indicates host for that year.

References

External links
Olympic Qualifying – Men, CONCACAF.com
Fútbol Masculino Proceso Olímpico, UNCAFut.com 

Qualification
Olympic Qualifying Championship, Men's qualification